Ceryx ampla is a moth of the subfamily Arctiinae. It was described by Francis Walker in 1864. It is found on Aru in Indonesia and Papua New Guinea.

References

Ceryx (moth)
Moths described in 1864